Baikida Carroll (born January 15, 1947) is an American jazz trumpeter.

Carroll studied at Southern Illinois University and at the Armed Forces School of Music. Following this he became a member of the Black Artists Group in St. Louis, where he directed their big band. This group recorded in Europe in the 1970s.

Biography
Carroll was born in St. Louis, Missouri, United States, and attended Vashon and Soldan High School.  He studied trumpet with Vernon Nashville. His early influences were Clark Terry and Lee Morgan. Carroll worked with the All City Jazz Band, whose members included Lester Bowie, J.D. Parran and James ”Jabbo” Ware. While still in high school he worked with Albert King, Little Milton, and Oliver Sain. Carroll joined the United States Army in 1965 and served in the 3rd Infantry Division Band in Wurzburg, Germany. In 1968, he returned to St. Louis and led the Baikida Carroll Sextet, also becoming orchestra conductor/director of the Black Artists Group of St. Louis (BAG), a multidisciplinary arts collective that brought him into contact with Julius Hemphill, Oliver Lake, Hamiet Bluiett, and John Hicks. In 1972,  Carroll, Lake, Joseph Bowie, Charles "Bobo" Shaw, and Floyd LeFlore ventured to Paris, France, touring as Oliver Lake and the Black Artists Group. He also performed with Anthony Braxton, Alan Silva, Steve Lacy, and his own quartet. He taught theory and trumpet at The American Center in Paris and was artist in residence at the Cité internationale des arts.

Carroll moved to New York City in 1975 and was active in the free jazz community. He also taught at Queens College. He began composing music for plays with Joseph Papp at the New York Public Theater and continued to score for Broadway and WNET-TV as part of the series The American Playhouse and at McCarter Theatre. In 1981, he performed at the Woodstock Jazz Festival that celebrated the tenth anniversary of the Creative Music Studio. His performance and recorded history includes works with Julius Hemphill, Howard Johnson, Sam Rivers, Charlie Haden, Jack DeJohnette, Cecil Taylor, Reggie Workman, Oliver Lake, Carla Bley, Wadada Leo Smith, Jay McShann, Bobby Bradford, Roscoe Mitchell, and Tim Berne.

Discography

As leader
Orange Fish Tears (Palm, 1974)
The Spoken Word (HatHUT, 1977)
Shadows and Reflections (Soul Note, 1982)
Door of the Cage (Soul Note, 1995)
Marionettes on a High Wire (OmniTone, 2001)

As sideman
 Human Arts Ensemble, Whisper of Dharma, Universal Justice, 1972
 Solidarity Unit, Inc., Red, Black and Green, Universal Justice, 1972
 Julius Hemphill, Dogon A.D., Mbari, 1972
 Oliver Lake, NTU, Ntu: Point from Which Creation Begins, Freedom, 1976
 Black Artists Group, In Paris, Aries 1973, BAG Records, 1973; reissued by Aguirre in 2018
 Julius Hemphill, Coon Bid'ness, Freedom, 1975
 Hidden Strength, Hidden Strength, United Artists, 1975
 Michael Gregory, Heart and Center, Novus Records, 1979
 Michael Gregory, Gifts, Novus, 1979
 Vinny Golia, Openhearted, Nine Winds, 1979
 Oliver Lake, Prophet, Black Saint, 1980
 Muhal Richard Abrams, Mama and Daddy, Black Saint, 1980
 Muhal Richard Abrams, Blues Forever, Black Saint, 1980
 Oliver Lake, Plug It, Gramavision, 1982
 Oliver Lake, Clevont Fitzhubert, Black Saint, 1981
 Muhal Richard Abrams, Rejoicing with the Light, Black Saint, 1980
 Jack DeJohnette, Inflation Blues, ECM, 1983
 David Murray, Live at Sweet Basil Volume 1, Black Saint, 1984
 David Murray, Live at Sweet Basil Volume 2, Black Saint, 1984
 Michele Rosewoman, The Source, Black Saint, 1984
 John Carter, Castles of Ghana, Gramavision, 1986
 David Murray, New Life, Black Saint, 1988
 Carla Bley, Watts Work Family Album, ECM, 1989
 Oliver Lake, Gramavision Tenth Anniversary Sampler, Gramavision, 1990
 Graham Parker, Struck by Lightning, Demon, 1991
 Charles Papasoff, Papasoff, Red Toucan, 1993
 Steve Weisberg, I can't stand another night alone (in bed with you), ECM, 1994
 New York Collective, Naxos, 1996
 Pheeroan akLaff, Global Mantras, Modern Masters, 1997
 New York Collective, I Don't Know This World Without Don Cherry, Naxos, 1998
 Sam Rivers, Inspiration, BMG/RCA Victor, 1999
 Sam Rivers, Culmination, BMG/RCA Victor, 1999
 Alan Silva, H.Con.Res.57/Treasure Box, Eremite, 2003
 Oliver Lake, Cloth, Passin' Thru, 2003
 John Lindberg, Winter Birds, Between The Lines, 2005
 Leslie Ritter, This Christmas Morning, Collective Works, 2005
 Tim Berne Octet, Insomnia, Clean Feed, 2011

As producer
 Danielle Woerner, She Walks In Beauty, Parnassus, 1998
 Jeff Siegel, Magical Spaces, Consolidated Artist Productions, 2005
 Danielle Woerner, Voices of the Valley, Albany Music Distribution, 2006

References
Citations

General references
Ron Wynn, [ Baikida Carroll] at Allmusic

External links
 Official website

1947 births
Living people
Musicians from St. Louis
American jazz trumpeters
American male trumpeters
21st-century trumpeters
Jazz musicians from Missouri
21st-century American male musicians
American male jazz musicians